The kkStB 112 was a class of express train 2-2-2 tank engine operated by the Imperial Royal Austrian State Railways (kaiserlich-königliche österreichische Staatsbahnen or kkStB).

In order for the kkStB to provide a fast feeder service to express train stations, a requirement arose for small, fast locomotives. Karl Gölsdorf designed Class 112 for this purpose. On their deliver in 1907 by Krauss in Linz the two engines were fitted with a small smokebox superheater, that was later removed.

The small locomotives were initially used to haul newspaper trains between Vienna and Linz. Later they hauled the shuttle (Pendler) between Hütteldorf and Unterpurkersdorf, a connecting line to the Vienna Stadtbahn, where they were marshalled in the centre of the train.

Number 112.02 was retired in 1937, whilst 112.01 went into the Deutsche Reichsbahn as number 69 011 where it was withdrawn from service in 1942.

References 

 Heribert Schröpfer, Triebfahrzeuge österreichischer Eisenbahnen - Dampflokomotiven BBÖ und ÖBB, alba, Düsseldorf, 1989

See also 
 Deutsche Reichsbahn 
 List of DRG locomotives and railbuses

2-2-2T locomotives
121
Railway locomotives introduced in 1907
Standard gauge locomotives of Austria
Krauss locomotives
Passenger locomotives